Resuscitation is the process of correcting physiological disorders (such as lack of breathing or heartbeat) in an acutely ill patient.  It is an important part of intensive care medicine, anesthesiology, trauma surgery and emergency medicine.  Well known examples are cardiopulmonary resuscitation and mouth-to-mouth resuscitation.

Variables

See also

Critical emergency medicine
Emergency medicine
Intensive care medicine